Pygmaepterys aliceae is a species of sea snail, a marine gastropod mollusk in the family Muricidae, the murex snails or rock snails.

Description
Original description: "Shell small for genus, elongated, with high, elevated spire; 6 fimbriated varices per whorl; varices with 6 short, bladelike serrations; intervarical areas and backs of varices of body whorl with 6 large, raised, fimbriated spiral cords; inside of lip with 6 large denticles; shell color pure white (holotype encrusted with the red foraminiferan Homotrema rubrum)."

Distribution
Locus typicus: "Bonaire Isl., Netherlands Antilles."

This species occurs in the Caribbean Sea off Bonaire.

References

 Petuch E.J. (1987). New Caribbean Molluscan Faunas. Charlottesville, Virginia: The Coastal Education and Research Foundation. 154 pp., 29 pls; addendum 2 pp., 1 pl.

Muricidae
Gastropods described in 1987